Robert Mallory (November 15, 1815 – August 11, 1885) was a nineteenth-century American politician and lawyer from Kentucky.

Born in Madison Court House, Virginia, Mallory attended private schools and graduated from the University of Virginia in 1827. He engaged in agricultural pursuits in La Grange, Kentucky, studied law and was admitted to the bar in 1837, commencing practice in New Castle, Kentucky. He was elected an Opposition and later Unionist to the United States House of Representatives in 1858, serving from 1859 to 1865, being unsuccessful for reelection in 1864. There, Mallory served as chairman of the Committee on Roads and Canals from 1859 to 1863. He was a delegate to the National Union Convention in 1866 and was one of the vice presidents of the Centennial Exposition in 1876. He resumed agricultural pursuits until his death near La Grange, Kentucky on August 11, 1885. He was interred in Spring Hill Family Cemetery in Ballardsville, Kentucky.

External links

1815 births
1885 deaths
People from Madison, Virginia
Opposition Party members of the United States House of Representatives from Kentucky
Unionist Party members of the United States House of Representatives from Kentucky
Kentucky lawyers
Kentucky Unionists
University of Virginia alumni
People of Kentucky in the American Civil War
People from La Grange, Kentucky
People from New Castle, Kentucky
19th-century American politicians
19th-century American lawyers
Members of the United States House of Representatives from Kentucky